Henry Bentley may refer to:

Henry Wilbur Bentley (1838–1907), American politician
Henry Bentley (cricketer) (1782–1857), English cricketer
Harry H. Bentley (1852–1922), Canadian politician

See also
Harry Bentley (disambiguation)